Kvashnin (masculine) or Kvashnina (feminine) is a Russian surname.

This surname is shared by the following people:

 Anatoly Kvashnin (born 1946), Chief of the Russian General Staff from 1997 to 2004 and Hero of the Russian Federation
 Konstantin Kvashnin (1898–1982), Soviet Russian football player and manager
 Yuri Kvashnin (born 1964), Soviet Russian pair skater

Russian-language surnames